Pavel Nedvěd (born 30 August 1972) is a Czech former professional footballer who played as a midfielder. He is widely considered as one of the greatest midfielders of his generation and as one of the most successful players to emerge from the Czech Republic, winning domestic and European accolades with Italian clubs Lazio, including the last Cup Winners' Cup, and Juventus, whom he led to the 2003 UEFA Champions League Final.

Nedvěd was a key member of the Czech team which reached the final of Euro 1996, during which he attracted international attention. He also captained the national team at UEFA Euro 2004, where they were defeated in the semi-final by eventual champions Greece, and Nedvěd was named as part of the Team of the Tournament. Furthermore, Nedvěd helped his team qualify for the 2006 FIFA World Cup for the first time since the breakup of Czechoslovakia. Due to his performances, as well as his quick and energetic runs during matches, Nedvěd was nicknamed "" ("Czech Fury") by Italian fans and "The Czech cannon" in English-language media. His nickname in Czech is Méďa ("Little Bear"), stemming from the similarity between his surname and the Czech word for bear, Medvěd.

Winning the Ballon d'Or as European Footballer of the Year in 2003, Nedvěd was the second Czech player to receive the honour and the first since the breakup of Czechoslovakia. During his career Nedvěd received a number of other individual awards, including the second Golden Foot award in 2004, Czech Footballer of the Year (four times) and the Golden Ball (six times). He was also named by Pelé as one of the FIFA 100, and was placed in the UEFA Team of the Year in 2003, 2004, and 2005. He retired following the 2008–09 season, after a 19-year professional career. Nedvěd played 501 league matches at club level (scoring 110 goals), and was capped 91 times for the Czech Republic (scoring 18 times).

Club career

Skoda Plzen and Dukla Prague loan spell 
Born on 30 August 1972 in Cheb and raised in nearby Skalná, Nedvěd began his football career in his native Czechoslovakia. A football fan from an early age, he began playing for his hometown club Tatran Skalná in 1977 at the age of five. Nedvěd moved on to Rudá Hvězda Cheb in 1985, playing one season before spending five years with Škoda Plzeň. In 1990, Nedvěd was loaned to Dukla Prague, a club run by the Army, as part of his military service. On 28 October 1991, Nedvěd played his first match for Dukla Prague. He played one season for Dukla in 1991 before finishing his military service, thus ending his loan from Plzeň. He then transferred to Sparta Prague in 1992. Plzeň was to receive 30% of the transfer fee should Nedvěd transfer to a foreign club.

Sparta Prague
Early in his career at Sparta, Nedvěd was sent off three times in just six matches. With Sparta, Nedvěd won one Czechoslovak First League title, two Gambrinus liga titles and a Czech Cup. In 1994, he received his first call up to the Czech Republic national team. His performance at UEFA Euro 1996, including a goal in the group stage against Italy, attracted attention; despite a verbal agreement with PSV, Nedvěd moved from Sparta Prague to Italian Serie A club Lazio. Sparta first sold Nedvěd to Slovak club 1. FC Košice (which had the same owner as Sparta) for a 1.5 million CZK transfer fee, and immediately, Košice sold Nedvěd to Lazio. Thus Sparta paid only a small fraction of the transfer fee to Plzeň. After Plzeň's protest, the Czech football association ordered Sparta to pay Plzeň 35 million CZK in compensation.

Nedvěd signed a four-year contract for a fee of ₤1.2 million.

Lazio 
Nedvěd made his league debut for Lazio on 7 September 1996 in a 1–0 away defeat against Bologna. He scored his first league goal for the club against Cagliari on 20 October 1996, finishing the 1996–97 season with seven goals. He became an integral part of the side, scoring four goals in three matches early in the 1997–98 season. The club had a 24-match unbeaten streak from November 1997 to April 1998, ending with a league match against Juventus in which Nedvěd was sent off. That season, Lazio won the 1997–98 Coppa Italia and reached the final of the 1997–98 UEFA Cup. Nedvěd and Lazio began the 1998–99 season with a victory in the Supercoppa Italiana, Nedvěd scoring as the club defeated Juventus 2–1. He played a role in Lazio's road to the last-ever Cup Winners' Cup, scoring against Lausanne in the first round and in both legs of Lazio's 7–0 aggregate quarter-final victory over Panionios. In the 1999 UEFA Cup Winners' Cup Final, Nedvěd scored the decisive goal against Mallorca for Lazio's 2–1 win. This proved to be the last goal of the tournament, which was later discontinued.

Nedvěd was one of the ten highest-paid footballers in the Italian league in 1999. He played in the 1999 UEFA Super Cup against Manchester United at the beginning of the season, where Lazio won the match by a single goal. The club went on to win the Serie A title and Coppa Italia, completing a domestic double in 2000 with Nedvěd's help. In 2000, he won the Supercoppa Italiana with Lazio for a second time. With Siniša Mihajlović, Nedvěd was one of two Lazio players sent off in the quarter-final of the 2000 Coppa Italia held in December, where the defending champions lost 5–3 on aggregate to Udinese.

Nedvěd played UEFA Champions League football with Lazio, scoring against Real Madrid in a 2–2 draw in the second group stage before the Italian side was eliminated. In Lazio's final Champions League match of the season, Nedvěd was criticised by Leeds United manager David O'Leary for a challenge on Alan Maybury (although the referee did not call a foul), and he received a three-match suspension from European competitions from UEFA.

Despite Nedvěd's signing a new four-year contract with Lazio in April 2001, the club tried to sell him and teammate Juan Sebastián Verón that summer, triggering fan protests against club chairman Sergio Cragnotti. The players were ultimately sold to Juventus and Manchester United respectively.

Juventus 

After five seasons with Lazio, Nedvěd was speculatively linked to several clubs (including Manchester United and Chelsea) before moving to Juventus in July 2001 for 75 billion lire (€38.7 million by fixed exchange rate). At Juventus, he replaced Zinedine Zidane, who had transferred to Real Madrid that summer. Nedvěd was a regular on Juventus' 2001–02 and 2002–03 Scudetto-winning teams. Although he was a substantial part of the club's championship season in 2003, he was also the subject of controversy. Nedvěd quit the Italian Footballers' Association in protest of the union's limit on non-European Union (EU) players; his native Czech Republic did not become an EU member until 2004. Although he was instrumental in leading Juventus to the 2003 UEFA Champions League final against Milan, he had to sit out the final due to an accumulation of yellow cards after his semi-final booking for a foul on Real Madrid midfielder Steve McManaman.

In December 2003, Nedvěd was named World Footballer of the Year by World Soccer magazine. Later that month, he won the European Footballer of the Year award over Thierry Henry and Paolo Maldini, the second Czech to win the award after Josef Masopust in 1962. Nedvěd received further recognition in his home country when he won the 2004 Golden Ball, awarded by Czech sportswriters, for the fifth time in seven years.

The 2004–05 season was frustrating for the midfielder, who was sidelined for two months by knee and head injuries and first considered retirement in April 2005. Although Juventus won Serie A titles that year and in 2006, the titles were revoked after the Calciopoli match fixing scandal. After the 2005–06 season, which ended with Juventus' relegation from Serie A despite its first-place finish, many stars (such as Fabio Cannavaro and Lilian Thuram) left the club and the remaining players' future was uncertain. After the 2006 World Cup, Nedvěd dispelled rumours about his departure by reiterating his desire to help Juventus regain promotion to Serie A, citing his family and his commitment to the club as reasons for his decision. He received a five-match ban after a red card against Genoa in December 2006, and repeated his threat to retire. However, he remained with the club until the end of the season and scored 11 league goals in the 2006–07 Serie B.

For the 2007–08 season, Juventus again played in Serie A. Nedvěd played frequently for the Bianconeri, contributing as the team's first-choice left winger and scoring two goals that season. He was again controversial: in November 2007, his tackle of Internazionale midfielder Luís Figo broke Figo's fibula. In April 2008, Nedvěd was hospitalised overnight for a concussion sustained in a collision with Roberto Guana during a match against Palermo.

Nedvěd scored Juventus' first league goal of the 2008–09 season in a 1–1 away draw with Fiorentina, and scored twice against Bologna in a 2–1 away win in October. On 26 February 2009, Nedvěd announced he would retire at the end of 2008–09 season to spend more time with his family. On 10 March 2009, he was substituted due to injury after 12 minutes of the Champions League round of 16 second leg match against Chelsea. Due to his impending retirement and his club's 3–2 loss on aggregate, it was his last European match for Juventus. Nedvěd retired at the end of the season, captaining the final match against former team Lazio and setting up Vincenzo Iaquinta's goal for a 2–0 victory.

FK Skalná 
On 23 September 2017 it was announced that Nedvěd transferred to FK Skalná, based in the village of Skalná, Nedvěd's native village. The club plays in the 1. B class of in the Karlovy Vary Region (7th level of Czech football hierarchy). Chairman of the club had said: "It was Pavel's dream to play with his son and now it will come true". He further added that it seems likely that his planned fielding on 2 June 2018 in a home fixture against TJ Baník Královské Poříči B is a one-off event, due to Nědved's residency in Italy and employment as vice-president of Juventus. Nedvěd was indeed in the starting line-up, but Skalná lost the home fixture 1–4, Nedvěd did not score and neither did his son.

International career 
Nedvěd began playing for Czechoslovakia national youth teams in 1988, representing his country in the under-15 age group before progressing to 16, 17 and 18. In 1992, he made his first appearance on the under-21 team, playing seven times between 1992 and 1993.

The midfielder debuted for the re-formed Czech Republic national team in June 1994 in a 3–1 win over the Republic of Ireland. His first major tournament was Euro 1996, where he scored his first senior international goal and helped his team reach the final. He was also part of the Czech team which placed third in the 1997 FIFA Confederations Cup, defeating Uruguay in the third-place match. Nedvěd scored two goals during the tournament, both which came during the Czech Republic's 6–1 win over the United Arab Emirates in their final group match, which allowed them to progress to the semi-finals, where they were defeated by eventual champions Brazil.

Euro 1996 
The Czech Republic were not expected to make an impact against the favoured Germany side in their opening match; Nedvěd missed two scoring chances and was one of ten players to receive a yellow card as Germany won 2–0. However, he contributed defensively, clearing a goal-bound shot from Christian Ziege off the line.

Nedvěd scored his first senior international goal in his nation's Group C match against Italy, putting the Czech Republic in the lead 1–0 after four minutes. Although Italy scored an equaliser during the first half, they were reduced to ten men and the Czech Republic scored again before half-time for a 2–1 win. Nedvěd played in the third group match, against Russia, receiving his second yellow card of the tournament as the Czechs tied 3–3 to advance to the knockout stage.

Due to a suspension, Nedvěd missed the Czech Republic's quarter-final match against Portugal. The Czechs won in his absence and progressed. In the semi-final against France, Nedvěd was named man of the match as the Czech Republic advanced to the final after a penalty shoot–out, where he scored his nation's second penalty shot. He and the Czech Republic team lost 2–1 in the final to Germany, who scored a golden goal.

Euro 2000 
Before Euro 2000, Nedvěd was unable to train normally due to an ankle injury. The Czechs' first match (against the Netherlands) saw him and international teammate Jan Koller hit the woodwork without scoring, before the Dutch scored a controversial penalty to win 1–0. In the second match, against France, he was fouled, where the resultant Czech penalty was converted by Karel Poborský to even the score at 1–1. Despite two shots on goal, Nedvěd could not beat French goalkeeper Fabien Barthez and France won the match 2–1. He played in the third group match, against Denmark; despite the Czechs' 2–0 victory, the team was eliminated from the tournament. After Euro 2000, Nedvěd took over the national team captaincy from Jiří Němec.

Euro 2004 
Nedvěd was instrumental in the Euro 2004 group stage match against the Netherlands. Two goals down after 19 minutes, he gave a man of the match performance as the Czechs rebounded to win 3–2. Nine players (including Nedvěd) were rested for the group match against Germany, with the Czechs already qualified for the knockout stage. He received a yellow card, upheld on appeal, in the quarter-final match against Denmark. This meant Nedvěd would miss the final if he received another yellow card in the semi-final against Greece. However, Greece defeated the Czechs and Nedvěd was substituted after a knee injury. After their exit from the tournament, Nedvěd announced his retirement from the national team; he was named to the Team of the Tournament alongside countrymen Petr Čech and Milan Baroš.

2006 World Cup 
The midfielder was persuaded by coach Karel Brückner and his teammates to come out of international retirement in time for the 2006 World Cup qualification playoffs against Norway, in which the Czech Republic qualified for the final tournament for the first time since the breakup of Czechoslovakia. Although Nedvěd's World Cup participation was jeopardised by a June knee injury, he was able to play.

The Czechs won the first match of the 2006 World Cup with 3–0 against the United States, but key players were injured. They then lost their next two group matches against Ghana and eventual winners Italy, finishing third in their group. Nedvěd's apparent goal at the beginning of the second half in the match against Ghana was ruled offside. His shots on goal against Italy were saved by Juventus teammate Gianluigi Buffon. Nedvěd again announced his retirement from the international scene before the August 2006 friendly match against Serbia, in which he made his 91st (and final) appearance. He refused to reverse his decision before Euro 2008, despite requests from teammates and Brückner. In the 91 appearances he made for his national side, Nedvěd scored 18 goals.

Style of play 
A complete, tenacious and consistent two-footed player, Nedvěd frequently played as a left-sided, offensive wide midfielder or as a left-winger throughout his career, due to his crossing ability with his left foot, as well as due to his ability to cut inside and shoot with his right foot, although he was capable of playing anywhere in midfield due to his offensive and defensive work-rate, as well as his versatility, physicality, and tackling ability, which enabled him to start attacking plays after winning back possession. He was also deployed as a central midfielder on occasion, as well as in an attacking midfield and playmaking role, or as a supporting striker, where he excelled as an assist-man due to his excellent dribbling ability, passing range and vision. Primarily known for his powerful shots and volleys from distance, as well as his stamina, he was also a dynamic player, who was noted for his speed, acceleration, endurance, technique and goal-scoring ability, which often saw him carry the ball and undertake forward surging runs from midfield. He was also an accurate set-piece and penalty kick taker.

Known for his trademark long blonde hair, which made him a highly recognisable player on the pitch, Nedvěd was nicknamed "Furia Ceca" ("Czech Fury", or also "Blind Fury" in Italian) by Italian fans, who noted his skill, consistency and verve, as well as his stamina, pace, power and determination. In the English-language media, he was called "the Czech cannon". His former Lazio boss Sven-Göran Eriksson described him as "an atypical midfielder, totally complete". Despite his ability, Nedvěd's tenacious playing style and disciplinary record also led him to be criticised by some in the sport, who accused him of being excessively reckless in his tackles and of going to ground too easily when challenged.

Post-playing career 

Nedvěd ran the Prague Half Marathon in 2010 (his first race at the distance), finishing the course in 1:49:44. He ran the 2012 Prague Marathon in a time of 3:50:02 for the 42-kilometre course.

Nedvěd was named International Personality at the 2012 FAI International Football Awards in February. In January 2013, he was banned from attending Serie A matches for three weeks after he insulted referee Paolo Valeri during Juventus' match against Sampdoria.

Directorship
On 12 October 2010, Exor (the Agnelli family's investment company) nominated Nedvěd for a seat on the Juventus board of directors; he remains a director as of the 2018–19 season. On 23 October 2015, Nedvěd was appointed vice chairman of the board of directors.

On 28 November 2022, the entire Juventus board of directors, including Nedvěd, resigned from their respective roles amid scandal. On 20 January 2023, Nedvěd was suspended for eight months from holding office in Italian football as punishment for capital gain violations as part of the Plusvalenza scandal.

Personal life 
The son of Václav and Anna, Nedvěd had lived with his wife Ivana since 1992. The couple have two children, named Ivana and Pavel after their parents. The couple split in 2019 and the ex-footballer started dating an equestrian  23 years his junior.

Career statistics

Club 
Sources: League matches, Coppa Italia stats at Juventus, European competition stats

International

Scores and results list Czech Republic's goal tally first, score column indicates score after each Nedvěd goal.

Honours 

Sparta Prague
Czechoslovak First League: 1992–93
Czech Republic Football League: 1993–94, 1994–95
Czech Cup: 1995–96

Lazio
Serie A: 1999–2000
Coppa Italia: 1997–98, 1999–2000
Supercoppa Italiana: 1998, 2000
UEFA Cup Winners' Cup: 1998–99
UEFA Super Cup: 1999
UEFA Cup runner-up: 1997–98

Juventus
Serie A: 2001–02, 2002–03
Supercoppa Italiana: 2002, 2003
Serie B: 2006–07
UEFA Champions League runner-up: 2002–03

Czech Republic
UEFA European Championship runner-up: 1996

Individual

Golden Ball (Czech Republic): 1998, 2000, 2001, 2003, 2004, 2009
Největší Čech (List of Greatest Czechs): 41st place
Czech Footballer of the Year: 1998, 2000, 2003, 2004
ESM Team of the Year: 2000–01, 2002–03
Sportsperson of the Year (Czech Republic): 2003
Serie A Footballer of the Year: 2003
Serie A Foreign Footballer of the Year: 2003
Guerin d'Oro: 2003
UEFA Club Best Midfielder of the Year: 2002–03
World Soccer Awards Player of the Year: 2003
Ballon d'Or: 2003
RSSSF Player of the Year. 2003
UEFA Team of the Year: 2003, 2004, 2005
UEFA European Championship Team of the Tournament: 2004
Golden Foot: 2004
FIFA 100: 2004
FAI International Football Awards – International Personality: 2012
UEFA Ultimate Team of the Year (substitute; published 2015)
Juventus Greatest XI of All Time: 2017

Bibliography

References

External links 

 
 
 
 

1972 births
Living people
People from Cheb
Czechoslovak footballers
Czech footballers
Association football midfielders
AC Sparta Prague players
Dukla Prague footballers
Juventus F.C. players
S.S. Lazio players
Czechoslovak First League players
Czech First League players
Serie A players
Serie B players
Ballon d'Or winners
World Soccer Magazine World Player of the Year winners
FIFA 100
Czechoslovakia under-21 international footballers
Czech Republic international footballers
UEFA Euro 1996 players
1997 FIFA Confederations Cup players
UEFA Euro 2000 players
UEFA Euro 2004 players
2006 FIFA World Cup players
Czech expatriate footballers
Czech expatriate sportspeople in Italy
Expatriate footballers in Italy
Juventus F.C. directors
Recipients of Medal of Merit (Czech Republic)
Sportspeople from the Karlovy Vary Region